Edward Rooper (25 January 1818 Wick Hall, Furze Hill, Brighton - 11 or 15 November 1854 Inkerman, Crimea) was an English soldier, landscape painter, and botanical collector and illustrator.

He was the fourth son of the Rev. Thomas Richard Rooper (1782-1865) and Persis Standly (1783-1871), with siblings William Henry Rooper, Marianne Rooper, George Rooper, Henrietta Persis Rooper and John Rooper. He was the grandson of John Rooper of Berkhamsted Castle.

He received a commission as 2nd Lieutenant in the Rifle Brigade on 2 September 1834 and was promoted to Captain on 2 September 1842, and to brevet Major on 26 September 1854. He served in South Africa with the Rifle Brigade after landing at Algoa Bay on 20 November 1846 and was promptly posted to the Kei where he took part in the Seventh Xhosa War, mainly in the Amatola Mountains. At the end of hostilities he was appointed Resident Magistrate of East London on 1 January 1849, a post which he held until June 1850 when he returned to England with his regiment. During this period he had a chance encounter with the explorer and painter, Thomas Baines, inviting him to his headquarters at Fort Glamorgan to see his own paintings which included many botanical illustrations. These paintings came to light in 1956 and were purchased by the Botanical Research Institute of Pretoria as a result of efforts by its librarian, Mary Gunn, following a suggestion by Baines' biographer John Peter Richard Wallis.

On 30 March 1852 he landed once again at Algoa Bay and set off for the Amatolas to take part in the Eighth Xhosa War, returning to England on 12 November 1853. In July 1854 he sailed from England with his Regiment for the Crimea where they arrived 20 September 1854. From a camp near Beicos Bay, the fleet anchorage in the Bosphorus, he wrote a letter to his brother, George Rooper of Lincoln’s Inn:

Edward was wounded at the Battle of Inkerman on 5 November 1854 and died on 11 or 15 November aboard the troop transport ship Golden Fleece on its way to the hospital at Scutari.

On occasion Edward sent seed and bulbs from South Africa to his father in Brighton, who in turn forwarded interesting items to William Jackson Hooker at Kew and Thomas Moore at the Chelsea Botanic Garden. Consequently it is Rev. Thomas Richard Rooper who was commemorated in Hypoxis rooperi T.Moore, and Kniphofia rooperi (T.Moore) Lem. Memorials to both father and son are to be found on the north wall of St Andrews Church in Hove.

References

External links
'The History of the Rifle Brigade (The Prince Consort’s Own) Formerly the 95th' -  Cope, William Henry, Sir, bart., 1811-1892
Genealogy of Thomas Richard Rooper

1818 births
1854 deaths
19th-century British artists
Botanical illustrators
British illustrators
British military personnel killed in the Crimean War